The Nutrition Labeling and Education Act (NLEA) (Public Law 101-535) is a 1990 United States Federal law. It was signed into law on November 8, 1990 by President George H. W. Bush.

The law gives the Food and Drug Administration (FDA) authority to require nutrition labeling of most foods regulated by the Agency; and to require that all nutrient content claims (for example, 'high fiber', 'low fat', etc.) and health claims meet FDA regulations.  The act did not require restaurants to comply with the same standards.

The regulations became effective for health claims, ingredient declarations, and percent juice labeling on May 8, 1993 (but percent juice labeling was exempted until May 8, 1994).

Effective Jan. 1, 2006, the Nutrition Facts Labels on packaged food products are required by the FDA to list how many grams of trans fatty acid (trans fat) are contained within one serving of the product.

Dietary Supplement Act of 1992
Senator Orrin Hatch of Utah introduced the Health Freedom Act of 1992 which would have blocked the FDA from using health claims as a reason to regulate dietary supplements as drugs.  The senator said he "entered the controversy after hearing from constituents in his home state, including both consumers and makers of dietary supplements". Hatch stated that the FDA "can put anybody out of business if they want to."  Hatch's bill did not get very far, but it encouraged Congress to pass the Dietary Supplement Act of 1992 (Public Law 102-571), which blocked the FDA from applying its forthcoming labeling rules for conventional foods to dietary supplements for another year, until the end of 1993.

The Nutritional Health Alliance, an industry lobby group, claimed credit for getting the  Dietary Supplement Act of 1992 passed.

See also
Dietary Supplement Health and Education Act of 1994
Food Guide Pyramid
New York State Restaurant Association v. New York City Board of Health

Notes

External links
 
 
 
 
 Nutritional Health Alliance v. Shalala, 953 F.Supp. 526 (S.D.N.Y., 1997) Challenge, on First Amendment grounds, the NLEA framework requiring advanced FDA authorization for health claims made on vitamin labels.

1990 in law
United States federal health legislation